Tevin Mitchel (born August 3, 1992) is a former  American football cornerback. He was drafted by the Washington Redskins in the sixth round of the 2015 NFL Draft. He played college football at the University of Arkansas.

Professional career

Washington Redskins
In the 2015 NFL Draft, the Washington Redskins had three picks in the sixth round of the 2015 NFL Draft. The Redskins drafted Mitchel with their second sixth round pick. He would join his college teammate, linebacker Martrell Spaight, who was drafted earlier in the fifth round. He signed a four-year, $2.4 million contract on May 11, 2015. After tearing the labrum in his left shoulder, the Redskins waived/injured him on August 5, 2015.

Indianapolis Colts
A day after being waived/injured by the Redskins, Mitchel was claimed by the Indianapolis Colts on August 6, 2015.

On September 3, 2016, Mitchel was placed on injured reserve. On September 9, he was released from the Colts' injured reserve with an injury settlement. He was re-signed to the practice squad on November 1, 2016. He signed a reserve/future contract with the Colts on January 2, 2017.

On August 23, 2017, Mitchel was waived/injured by the Colts and placed on injured reserve. He was released on September 26, 2017.

Oakland Raiders
On October 24, 2017, Mitchel was signed to the Oakland Raiders' practice squad. He signed a reserve/future contract with the Raiders on January 2, 2018. He was waived/injured on August 21, 2018, and was placed on injured reserve.

Hamilton Tiger-Cats
Mitchel signed with the Hamilton Tiger-Cats of the Canadian Football League on May 7, 2019. He was released on March 4, 2020.

Saskatchewan Roughriders
Mitchel signed with the Saskatchewan Roughriders on March 6, 2020. After the CFL canceled the 2020 season due to the COVID-19 pandemic, Mitchel chose to opt-out of his contract with the Roughriders on August 28, 2020.

Personal life
Mitchel's father, Eric, is a retired quarterback that was drafted 165th overall by the New England Patriots in the 1989 NFL Draft.

References

External links
Washington Redskins bio
Arkansas Razorbacks bio

1992 births
Living people
American football cornerbacks
Arkansas Razorbacks football players
Washington Redskins players
Indianapolis Colts players
Oakland Raiders players
People from Mansfield, Texas
Sportspeople from the Dallas–Fort Worth metroplex
Hamilton Tiger-Cats players
Canadian football defensive backs
Saskatchewan Roughriders players